Strelcha Municipality is in southern Bulgaria, part of Pazardzhik Province. The territory is part of Sredna Gora mountain, with the lowest point 304 m AMSL and the highest - 1,572 m AMSL. The railway connecting Panagyurishte Town with Plovdiv City passes through the municipality.

Settlements
Beyond the capital, Strelcha Town, there are four villages in the municipality:

 Blatnitsa
 Dyulevo
 Smilets
 Svoboda

Demography
At the 2011 census, the population of Strelcha was 4,913. Most of the inhabitants (74.04%) were Bulgarians, and there was a significant minority of Gypsies/Romani (5.84%). 19.76% of the population's ethnicity was unknown.

External links
 Strelcha municipality website

References

Municipalities in Pazardzhik Province